(styled in all caps) is an American music magazine devoted to "jazz, blues and beyond", the last word indicating its expansion beyond the jazz realm which it covered exclusively in previous years. The publication was established in 1934 in Chicago, Illinois. It is named after the "downbeat" in music, also called "beat one", or the first beat of a musical measure.

DownBeat publishes results of annual surveys of both its readers and critics in a variety of categories.  The DownBeat Jazz Hall of Fame includes winners from both the readers' and critics' poll. The results of the readers' poll are published in the December issue, those of the critics' poll in the August issue.

Popular features of DownBeat magazine include its "Reviews" section where jazz critics, using a '1-Star to 5-Star' maximum rating system, rate the latest musical recordings, vintage recordings, and books; articles on individual musicians and music forms; and its famous "Blindfold Test" column, in a which a musician listens to records by other artists, tries to guess who they are, and rates them using the 5-star maximum rating system.

History
DownBeat was established in 1934 in Chicago, Illinois. In September 1939, the magazine announced that its circulation had increased from "a few hundred five years ago to more than 80,000 copies a month", and that it would change from monthly to fortnightly from the following month. In 1972 the publisher of the magazine was Maher Publishers. In April 1979, DownBeat went to a monthly schedule for the first time since 1939.

In Summer 1960 DownBeat launched the Japanese edition. 

DownBeat was named Jazz Publication of the Year in 2016, 2017, 2018, 2019, and 2021 by the Jazz Journalists Association.

Awards

Lifetime Achievement Award 

 1981 John H. Hammond
 1982 George Wein
 1983 Leonard Feather
 1984 Billy Taylor
 1985 Lawrence Berk
 1986 Orrin Keepnews
 1987 David Baker
 1988 John Conyers Jr.
 1989 Norman Granz
 1990 Rudy Van Gelder
 1991 Bill Cosby
 1992 Rich Matteson
 1993 Gunther Schuller
 1994 Marian McPartland
 1995 Willis Conover
 1996 Chuck Suber
 1997 William P. Gottlieb
 1998 Bruce Lundvall
 1999 Sheldon Meyer
 2000 George Avakian
 2001 Milt Gabler
 2002 
 2003
 2004
 2005 Creed Taylor
 2006 Claude Nobs
 2007 Dan Morgenstern
 2008
 2009
 2010 Manfred Eicher
 2011
 2012
 2013
 2014
 2015
 2016
 2017 George Avakian
 2018
 2019
 2020
 2021
 2022 Gretchen Valade
 2023 Randall Kline

Hall of Fame 
The DownBeat Jazz Hall of Fame's current membership, by year, is listed in the following table. The Readers' Poll began in 1952, the Critics' Poll in 1961, and the Veterans Committee in 2008.

Veterans Committee Hall of Fame 
 2008: Jo Jones, Jimmie Lunceford, Erroll Garner, Harry Carney, Jimmy Blanton
 2009: Oscar Pettiford, Tadd Dameron
 2010: Baby Dodds, Chick Webb, Philly Joe Jones, Billy Eckstine
 2011: Paul Chambers
 2012: Gene Ammons, Sonny Stitt
 2013: Robert Johnson
 2014: Bing Crosby, Dinah Washington
 2015: Muddy Waters
 2016: Hoagy Carmichael
 2017: Eubie Blake, George Gershwin, Herbie Nichols
 2018: Marian McPartland

Album of the Year

Critics' Poll

See also 
 The Mary Lou Williams Women in Jazz Award
 International Association for Jazz Education (IAJE)
 Grammy Lifetime Achievement Award (not jazz exclusively, but many recipients are jazz musicians)
 BBC Jazz Awards
 NEA Jazz Masters
 Benny Heller

References

External links
Down Beat website
"About Down Beat: A History As Rich As Jazz"
The Jazz Journalists Association Lifetime Achievement Award
Nesuhi Ertegun, Jazz Hall of Fame 
Arts For Art Lifetime Achievement Award
NAMM Oral History Interview with Kevin Maher January 25, 2014
DownBeat Critics Poll Archives at Acclaimed Music Forums

Blues music magazines
Jazz awards
Jazz magazines
Magazines established in 1934
Magazines published in Chicago
Monthly magazines published in the United States
Music magazines published in the United States